Bijoy Varghese (born 14 March 2000) is an Indian professional footballer who plays as a centre back for Indian Super League club Kerala Blasters.

Club career

Early life and youth career
Bijoy was born in Pulluvila, a coastal village located in the Thirivananthapuram district, Kerala. Bijoy started playing football during his school days and was a member of his school football team. He initially played as a striker and later switched into central defensive position. At his 15, Bijoy joined Kovalam Football Club and played for their youth team. In 2018, he became part of the Kerala team who reached in the finals of the International School Championship, where he won the best defender of the tournament award. After his performance for the Kerala team, Bijoy was selected into the Indian team for Asian school Championship. He was later selected into the SAI football team that participated in the youth league held at Shillong. Bijoy was included in the final squad of Kerala team for the 2019–20 Santosh Trophy. However the tournament was cancelled due to COVID-19 pandemic in India.

Kerala Blasters 
In 2021, he was signed by the Indian Super League club Kerala Blasters to his first ever professional contract and were put into their reserve side. After an impressive performance in the 2020–21 season of Kerala Premier League, Bijoy was promoted to the club's senior side in that year itself to participate in the 2021–22 ISL season. He made his debut for the Blasters against Delhi FC in the 2021 Durand Cup match on 21 September 2021. which they lost 1–0 at full-time. Bijoy made his Indian Super League debut  on 19 November 2021 against ATK Mohun Bagan FC, which they lost 4–2.

On 21 April 2022, the Blasters announced that they have extended the contract of Bijoy until 2025. He was given a new jersey number 21, which the club had retired after Sandesh Jhingan's departure in 2020.

Career statistics

Club

Honours 
Kerala Blasters

 Indian Super League runner up: 2021–22.

References

External links 
 
 
 Bijoy Varghese at Indian Super League

2000 births
Living people
Association football defenders
Indian footballers
Footballers from Kerala
I-League 2nd Division players
Kerala Blasters FC Reserves and Academy players
Indian Super League players
Kerala Blasters FC players